is a Japanese retired professional basketball player who formerly played for the Riesen Ludwigsburg in the German Basketball Bundesliga and BV Chemnitz 99 of the German ProA.

He has been a member of the Japan national basketball team.

Career statistics 

|-
| align="left" | 2017-18
| align="left" | Ryukyu
| 55 || 8 || 12.7 || .416 || .402 || .720 || 1.1|| 2.1 || .3 || .1 ||  3.9
|-

References

External links
 German BBL Profile
 Eurobasket Profile

1984 births
Living people
Nagoya Diamond Dolphins players
Sportspeople from Fukui Prefecture
Point guards
Ryukyu Golden Kings players
Japanese men's basketball players
NINERS Chemnitz players
Shimane Susanoo Magic players
Kawasaki Brave Thunders players
Asian Games medalists in basketball
Basketball players at the 2010 Asian Games
Basketball players at the 2014 Asian Games
Asian Games bronze medalists for Japan

Medalists at the 2014 Asian Games